Universal Media Server is a DLNA-compliant UPnP media server. It originated as a fork of PS3 Media Server. It allows streaming of media files to a wide range of devices including video game consoles, smart TVs, smartphones, and Blu-ray players. It streams and transcodes multimedia files over a network connection to the rendering device, ensuring that a supported rendering device will receive the content in a format supported by the device. Transcoding is accomplished through packages from AviSynth, FFMpeg, MEncoder, and VLC.

Enhancements over its predecessor, PS3 Media Server, include web interface support for non-DLNA devices, more supported renderers, automatic bit rate adjustment, and many other transcoding improvements.

See also
 UPnP AV media servers
 Comparison of UPnP AV media servers
 PS3 Media Server

References

External links

Media servers
Multimedia software